Heteroherpia is a genus of solenogaster, and the only genus in the Heteroherpiidae family.

References 

Endemic fauna of South Africa
Sterrofustia
Monogeneric mollusc families